Illène Pevec (born June 6, 1948) is an author, journalist, children's activist, and educator who works in developing youth gardens at schools and community centers. Based in Carbondale, Colorado, Pevec serves as the program director for Fat City Farmers, a local food education program in Basalt, Colorado. She is a multinational citizen (Brazil, US, and Canada) and has developed youth gardens in all three countries. Pevec authored Growing a Life: Teen Gardeners Harvest Food, Health, and Joy (New Village Press 2016), a book that integrates her work in US community youth gardens with observations from other disciplines to generate a better understanding of the positive effect mentored urban gardening can have on youth development.

Personal life 
Pevec was born in Brazil, but was brought up in Denver, Colorado. Her approach to education and life has roots in her experiences hiking, gardening, skiing and swimming as a child. Pevec is the mother of five children and has lived in Canada, Brazil, Portugal, and the United States.

Education 
Pevec attended Stanford University from 1966-1969 but later graduated from Marylhurst University in 1993 with a bachelor's degree in Interdisciplinary Humanities. Pevec received her master's degree in Curriculum Studies from the University of British Columbia in 2000. In 2011, she received her doctoral degree in Design and Planning from the College of Architecture and Planning at the University of Colorado, Denver.

School garden projects

Vancouver (1998–2002): Spirit of Nature Gardens 
Spirit of Nature Gardens began as a research project to revitalize urban school grounds through school and community gardening. Pevec partnered with Tracy Penner to design and construct a garden that would serve inner city children as an outdoor learning environment for fine arts, gardening and cooking at the Grandview U'uqinak'uuh Community School in Vancouver. With help from students, parents, teachers, and community members, Pevec and Penner transformed one acre of underused land into a site for learning and community gatherings. The project won the "Creating Healthy Communities for Children and Youth" award from the Canadian Society for Children and Youth. Pevec also developed a curriculum for students to learn about the garden's plants, uses, and folklore.

Brazil (2001–2011): A Child's Garden of Peace 
Pevec founded A Child's Garden of Peace in 2001 to provide organically grown produce, medicinal plants, and education in environmental responsibility to Brazilian communities. She worked with educators to develop community youth gardens in Santo Angelo, São Borja and Rocinha.

Pevec produced and co-edited a documentary about her work in Brazil entitled A Child's Garden of Peace (2005). The film toured international festivals from 2005–2006 and ran on PBS's award-winning Natural Heroes series.

Colorado (2005–2013) 
In 2006, Pevec and Ian Bates developed an educational garden for 90 learning disabled students at the Facilitated Flatirons Academy in Lafayette. The Facilitated Flatirons Academy project was funded by the University of Colorado Outreach. She also created school gardens and horticulture education programs at Roaring Fork High School and Yampah Mountain High School.

Fat City Farmers 
Pevec is the program director at Fat City Farmers, a nonprofit organization founded in 2006 to improve personal and community health by supporting gardens and the local food system in Basalt, Colorado. Pevec coordinates garden education with regional schools in four counties and creates gardening curriculums for Colorado teachers in support of active learning. In 2014, she began an immigrant community garden at Roaring Fork High School for Spanish speaking immigrant families in partnership with Valley Settlement Project and Fat City Farmers.

Publications

Curricula 
 Ethnobotany: Patterns in Relationships, 2002. Vancouver, Canada: Evergreen.
 Cries in the Dark: Violence Prevention for Young People, 1995. Vancouver, Canada: Arts Umbrella.
 Arts and Multiculturalism, 1991. Vancouver, Canada: Arts Umbrella.

Journals/educational magazines 
 Pevec, I., Barnett, M. Nzira, M., Shava, S. (2016) "Urban Agriculture." Urban Environmental Education Review.
 Chawla, L, Derr, V., Pevec, I. (2016) "Early Childhood." Urban Environmental Education Review.
 Chawla, L., Keena, K., Pevec, I., Stanley, E. (2014) "Green schoolyards as havens from stress and resources for resilience in childhood and adolescence." Health and Place, 28, 1-13.
 Chawla, L., Flanders-Cushing, D., Malinin, L. H., Pevec, I., van Vliet, W., and Zuniga, K. (2012). "Children and the Environment," Childhood Studies: 1–33.
 Pevec, I., (2009) "The ethical responsibility of schools, health care facilities and youth programs to provide access to healthy environments for young people: What evidence indicates on the role that interaction with gardens plays in children's health and well-being." Environmental Design Research Association Conference Proceedings, Washington DC.
 Pevec, I. (2009). "Book Review: Building Commons and Community." Children, Youth and Environments 19 (1).
 Pevec, I. (2007). "Book review: Doing Time in the Garden: Life Lessons Learning from Prison Horticulture." Children, Youth and Environments 17 (4).
 Pevec, I. (2007). "Film review: Sita, A Girl from Jambu." Children,Youth and Environments 17 (4).
 Pevec, I. (2007). "Book Review: Teaching Green: The Elementary Years. Teaching Green: The Middle Years." Children, Youth and Environments 17 (2).
 Pevec, I. (2005). "Book Review: Gaining Ground." Children, Youth and Environments 15 (2).
 Pevec, I., (2003). "Ethnobotanical gardens: celebrating the link between human culture and the natural world."  Green Teacher, 70, 25–28.
 Pevec, I., (2000). "The Spirit of Nature: The Grandview/U'uqiank'uuh Public Art Project", British Columbia Art Teachers' Association, 40 (2), 19–24.

Books 
Pevec, I., (2016). Growing a Life: Teen Gardeners Harvest Food, Health, and Joy. New York: New Village Press. In Growing a Life: Teen Gardeners Harvest Food, Health, and Joy (New Village Press, October 2016), Pevec interviews over 80 youth gardeners from Colorado, New York, New Mexico and California-based school gardening programs to investigate whether gardening affects at-risk teens' affective states and improves their ability to focus, their eating habits, and/or their environmental awareness.

Awards 
 2001: Creating Healthy Communities for Children and Youth: Canadian National Award for the Grandview Spirit of Nature Gardens and Programs, Society for Children and Youth
 2001: Environmental Stewardship for the Spirit of Nature Garden, British Columbia Landscape and Nursery Association
 2006–2006: Doctoral Excellence Fellowship at the University of Colorado at Denver
 2006: Lynda Simmons Award for Service to Youth, presented by the Children, Youth and Environment Center for Research, University of Colorado at Denver
 2006: Outstanding Student Award: Research and Creative Activities Symposium, University of Colorado at Denver for research project by graduate students (Children's Guide to Active Living: Participatory Action Research)

References 

1948 births
Living people
Marylhurst University alumni
University of British Columbia alumni
21st-century American writers
21st-century American women writers
Brazilian writers
Brazilian women writers